Labrys miyagiensis is a Gram-negative, aerobic motile and non-spore-forming bacteria from the family Xanthobacteraceae which has been isolated from grassland soil in Sendai in the Miyagi Prefecture in Japan.

References

Further reading

External links
Type strain of Labrys miyagiensis at BacDive -  the Bacterial Diversity Metadatabase

Hyphomicrobiales
Bacteria described in 2007